Leninskoye is a rural locality (a selo) and the administrative center of Leninskoye Rural Settlement, Nikolayevsky District, Volgograd Oblast, Russia. The population was 1,414 as of 2010. There are 28 streets.

References 

Rural localities in Nikolayevsky District, Volgograd Oblast